Plocaniophyllon is a genus of flowering plants belonging to the family Rubiaceae.

Its native range is Southeastern Mexico to Guatemala.

Species:
 Plocaniophyllon flavum Brandegee

References

Rubiaceae
Rubiaceae genera